Joachim Herrmann (October 29, 1928 - July 30, 1992) was an East German politician. He served as editor-in-chief of Neues Deutschland and as a member of the Politburo of the Central Committee of the SED.

Life 
From 1938 to 1945 he was a member of the Hitler Youth, and was drafted towards the end of World War II as a Luftwaffe auxiliary. He became a journalist, and by 1949 was working at the Berliner Zeitung. He then joined the SED.From 1949 to 1952 he was deputy editor-in-chief of the Freie Deutsche Jugend's paper Junge Welt, and from 1954 to 1960 was editor-in-chief. During that time he served as a member of the central council of the Freie Deutsche Jugend. 
From 1960 to 1962 he worked as deputy head of department in the Central Committee of the SED. He then served from 1962 to 1965 as editor-in-chief of the Berliner Zeitung. Following a stint as State Secretary for West German Affairs he became the editor-in-chief of the SED party paper Neues Deutschland until 1978.
During this time he quickly rose among government circles, and in 1967 became a candidate for member of the GDR's Central Committee. He was elected as a member of the Committee in 1971, and then became a member of the Politburo in 1978, at which time he resigned his position as editor-in-chief. From 1978 to 1989 he served as a member of the Politburo, overseeing media and propaganda operations as well as satellite parties. On November 10, 1989, he was expelled from the Central Committee of the SED, as part of a move to save face by General Secretary Egon Krenz. He was later also expelled from the SED in 1990.

He died in Berlin in 1992.

Awards 
Hermann received the Banner of Labor Order in 1968, the Patriotic Order of Merit in 1970, and the Order of Karl Marx in 1978 and 1988.

References
</ref>

Socialist Unity Party of Germany politicians
1928 births
1992 deaths
Hitler Youth members
East German journalists